Sandra Escacena (born March 30, 2001) is a Spanish actress, known for her starring role in the movie Veronica, a 2017 Spanish horror thriller film directed by Paco Plaza.

Career 
Between 2009 and 2012 Escacena studied theater at the School S.V. Performing Productions of Villaviciosa de Odón and between 2012 and 2014 in the Municipal School of Dramatic Art of Madrid. Since 2015 she has attended theater classes at the Primera Toma school in Madrid. During these years she has participated in various plays.

In 2016, at the suggestion of the casting director Arantza Velez, she auditioned to play Veronica in the film directed by Paco Plaza, and was finally chosen for the role. In December 2017 she was nominated for the Goya Award for the Best New Actress and for the Feroz Award for the Best Main Actress in a Film for her performance.

Filmography

Cinema

Theater

Awards

References

External links 

 

Living people
2001 births
21st-century Spanish actresses
Spanish child actresses
Spanish film actresses
Spanish stage actresses